Submit to Desire was the second full-length LP by Sleep Chamber. The lineup on this recording was John Zewizz, Darline Victor, Michael Moynihan, Richard Geller, and Chris Means.

Each side represented a different "mood", with side A (recorded at Newbury Sound Studio) representing Sleep Chamber's song-structured material, and side B (recorded on various radio broadcasts) containing more ambient music. The complete LP was mastered at Ville Platte. The album was pressed in the US by Inner-X-Musick with catalog number XXX-LP-05.

Track listing
Side A: Mood 1
 Fetish – 3:12
 Subterranean Subhuman – 3:12
 Kum Kleopatra – 4:31
 Submit to Desire – 5:24

Side B: Mood 2
 Priestess – 9:04
 The Empress - 4:13
 Oral Maze - 4:04
 Erotik Apparition - 3:00

References
http://www.discogs.com/Sleep-Chamber-Submit-To-Desire/release/293184
http://www.freewebs.com/theebradmiller/submittodesirelp.htm

1985 albums